The 2017 Sioux Falls Storm season was the team's eighteenth season as a professional indoor football franchise and ninth in the Indoor Football League (IFL). One of ten teams that competed in the IFL for the 2017 season, the Storm were members of the United Conference.

Led by head coach Kurtiss Riggs, the Storm played their home games at the Denny Sanford Premier Center in Sioux Falls, South Dakota.

Staff

Schedule
Key:

Regular season
All start times are local time

Standings

Postseason

Roster

References

External links
Sioux Falls Storm official statistics

Sioux Falls Storm
Sioux Falls Storm
Sioux Falls Storm